Sea Jet, or Advanced Electric Ship Demonstrator (AESD), is a naval testbed funded by the U.S. Navy's Office of Naval Research. The  vessel is operated out of the Carderock Division's Acoustic Research Detachment in Bayview, Idaho. 

Sea Jet was operated on Lake Pend Oreille, where she was used for test and demonstration of various technologies. Among the first technologies tested was an underwater discharge water jet from Rolls-Royce Naval Marine, Inc., called AWJ-21, a propulsion concept with the goals of providing increased propulsive efficiency, reduced acoustic signature, and improved maneuverability over previous Destroyer Class combatants.

Sea Jet demonstrated a few technologies that were integrated into the Zumwalt-class destroyer. Notable among these is the use of the tumblehome hull design.

References

External links

Sea Jet Advanced Electric Ship Demonstrator (AESD)

2005 ships
Experimental ships of the United States Navy
Military research of the United States
Evaluation methods